Cover Me Badd is an EP by Butch Walker, available as a digital download from the iTunes Music Store since October 11, 2005 and on CD since December 13, 2005. It contains six cover versions of songs originally performed by Kelly Clarkson, George Jones, Elvis Costello, Wings, Queen and Sandie Shaw (in sequential order). Most of the EP was recorded live, while tracks four and six were recorded in a recording studio.

Track listing

2005 EPs
Butch Walker albums
Epic Records EPs
Covers EPs